Aldini is an Italian surname. Notable people with the surname include:
Antonio Aldini (1755–1826), Italian lawyer and politician
Carlo Aldini (1894–1961), Italian actor and film producer
Giovanni Aldini (1762–1834), Italian physicist

Italian-language surnames